The Chimney Sweep may refer to:

The Chimney Sweep (film), directed by Georges Méliès
"The Shepherdess and the Chimney Sweep", a literary fairy tale by Hans Christian Andersen
Springman and the SS, also known as "The Chimney Sweep", a 1946 Czechoslovakian film directed by Jiří Brdečka and Jiří Trnka
Der Rauchfangkehrer, 1781 opera by Antonio Salieri